The Hassberge Formation is a geologic formation in Bavaria, Germany. It preserves fossils dating back to the Carnian stage of the Triassic period.

Fossil content

Insects 

Coleoptera
 Carabilarva triassica
 Dinoharpalus coptoclavoides
 Larvula triassica
 Protonectes germanicus
 Stargelytron larissae
 Zygadenia sp.
 Coptoclavidae indet.

Invertebrates 

 Euestheria kozuri
 Gregoriusella striatula
 Laxitextella dorsorecta
 L. freybergi

Ichnofossils 
 Apatopus lineatus

See also 

 List of fossiliferous stratigraphic units in Germany
 Benkersandstein, contemporaneous ichnofossiliferous formation of Bavaria
 Chañares Formation, fossiliferous formation of the Ischigualasto-Villa Unión Basin, Argentina
 Candelária Formation, contemporaneous fossiliferous formation of the Paraná Basin, Brazil
 Molteno Formation, contemporaneous fossiliferous formation of Lesotho and South Africa
 Pebbly Arkose Formation, contemporaneous fossiliferous formation of Botswana, Zambia and Zimbabwe
 Denmark Hill Insect Bed, contemporaneous fossiliferous unit of Queensland, Australia
 Madygen Formation, contemporaneous Lagerstätte of Kyrgyzstan

References

Bibliography 

 
 
 
 
 
 
 

Geologic formations of Germany
Triassic System of Europe
Triassic Germany
Carnian Stage
Sandstone formations
Shale formations
Lacustrine deposits
Ichnofossiliferous formations
Paleontology in Germany